The Beijing mouse-eared bat, or Peking myotis (Myotis pequinius) is a species of vesper bat. It is found only in China.

Taxonomy
It was described as a new species in 1908 by British zoologist Oldfield Thomas.
The holotype had been collected by Malcolm Playfair Anderson in 1907.

Description
Its fur is short and velvety, with the fur on its back a gray, reddish-brown.
In contrast, its belly fur is off-white.

Biology and ecology
It is insectivorous, consuming mostly beetles.
During the day, individuals roost in caves, though they may also roost in human structures.

Range and habitat
The Beijing mouse-eared bat is endemic to China, where it is found in the provinces of Anhui, Beijing, Henan, Jiangsu, Shanxi, and Sichuan.

Conservation
As of 2019, it is evaluated as a least-concern species by the IUCN.
It meets the criteria for this classification because its extent of occurrence exceeds ; its population is presumably large; and it is unlikely to be experiencing rapid population decline.

See also
 Beijing barbastelle

References

Mouse-eared bats
Mammals of China
Mammals described in 1908
Taxonomy articles created by Polbot
Taxa named by Oldfield Thomas
Bats of Asia